Nuijamaa (literally translated the "club land") is a former municipality in the province of South Karelia in Finland. The municipality had  inhabitants and an area of 136 km² in 1988. Nuijamaa was a Finnish-speaking municipality. Nuijamaa bordered the municipalities of Lappee, Lappeenranta, Lauritsala, Taipalsaari, Lemi, Luumäki, Ylämaa, and Joutseno. It also shared a border with Russia.

With the Continuation War in 1944,  of the municipality was ceded to Russia. In 1975, an international border with Russia opened in Nuijamaa. The total crossings in 2007 were over 1.7 million.

Nuijamaa was incorporated into Lappeenranta in 1989.

See also 
 Lake Nuijamaa
 Nuijamaa Church

References

Municipalities of South Karelia
Populated places established in 1903
Populated places disestablished in 1989
1903 establishments in Finland
1989 disestablishments in Finland